Lwow–Warsaw School may refer to:

 Lwów–Warsaw school of logic
 Lwów School of Mathematics
 Warsaw School of Mathematics
 Lwów–Warsaw School of History